is a Japanese voice actress. She was born in Kita-ku, Kyoto.

Notable voice roles

Anime roles
Sakura Hanasaki in (Ep 1, 4) Ai Tenshi Densetsu Wedding Peach DX
Kumi Honjo in Ai Yori Aoshi
Juna's mother in Arjuna
Skyress in Bakugan Battle Brawlers
Skyress in Bakugan Battle Brawlers: New Vestroia
Keneesh in Banner of the Stars
Keneesh in Banner of the Stars II
Ayako (ep 71), Reiko Andou (ep 255) in Detective Conan
Manley (ep 15) in Cowboy Bebop
Makali in Crest of the Stars
Kamimura in Dai-Guard
Isabella in Paradise Kiss
Alicia in Pokémon: The Rise of Darkrai
Sailor Lead Crow in Sailor Moon Sailor Stars
Natasha Kazamatsuri in Stellvia of the Universe
Additional voices in Sukeban Deka
D's Mother in Vampire Hunter D: Bloodlust
Sakura Hanasaki in (eps 14,45) Wedding Peach
Ruka in YuYu Hakusho

Dubbing roles
The Distinguished Gentleman (Celia Kirby (Victoria Rowell))
Dumb and Dumber (Mary Swanson (Lauren Holly))
Two Much (Liz Kerner (Daryl Hannah))

References

External links

Chiharu Suzuka at Ryu's Seiyuu Info

1958 births
Living people
Voice actresses from Kyoto
Japanese voice actresses